The 33rd World Orienteering Championships in conjunction with the 13th World Trail Orienteering Championships was held in Strömstad and Tanum, Sweden.

Results

References 

World Orienteering Championships
2016 in Swedish sport
International sports competitions hosted by Sweden
Orienteering in Sweden
August 2016 sports events in Europe
Sport in Västra Götaland County
2016 in orienteering